Brian Roger Leslie Hooper (born 18 May 1953) in Sheerwater, Woking, Surrey is a former British Olympic pole vaulter, athletics coach and winner of the 1982 World Superstars Championship.

Athletics
Hooper was the UK's top pole vaulter from 1974 to 1980, competing in two Olympic Games, two European Athletics Championships and winning the bronze medal at both the 1974 for the England team in Christchurch, New Zealand and the 1978 Commonwealth Games, representing England in Edmonton, Alberta, Canada. In 1986 he represented England for the third time at a Commonwealth Games, at the 1986 Commonwealth Games in Edinburgh, Scotland.

He won the 1980 Men's AAA / UK Championships pole vault title, setting his personal best height of 5.59m in the same year, which was then the United Kingdom Men's Pole Vault record.

Hooper also held the United Kingdom Masters (Veterans) Pole Vault best performance record, with a leap of 5.01 metres in 1994.  He is the current holder of the over-40s age group pole vault record.

Superstars
Hooper is the second most successful Superstars competitor ever, winning six titles, including becoming the only European to win the World Championship in 1982. He was only defeated in two events (his 1982 and 2004 UK heats), and is the only man to have won three International Superstars titles. Only three times World Superstars Champion Brian Budd managed to remain undefeated in all contests.

In 2004 (aged 50) he participated in the UK Championship again, and performed well finishing a very creditable fourth in his heat, winning the kayaking event, and finishing runner-up in the golf.  During the 2004 event he was at least 15 years older than all of the other competitors, competed with a torn pectoral muscle and was included in the event as a replacement at only seven day's notice!

Hooper also regularly competed in the Superteams version of the contest, representing "the Athletes", who were undefeated from 1979 to 1984. In 1979 he famously struggled to get on a balance beam during the obstacle course – almost costing his team the event – while disoriented after completing the sit-ups part of the race. In the years later, Hooper became one of the top British competitors in the obstacle course, regularly leaping the high wall in one stride.

Superstars record

Personal life
Hooper currently lives in Guildford, Surrey and is a personal fitness coach. In the 1970s he was an athletics coach at George Abbot School. He is separated and has one daughter, Tilly, who is also a pole vaulter who has competed in competitions including winning gold at the 2018 BUCS indoor national championships.

Achievements

References

1953 births
Living people
Olympic athletes of Great Britain
Athletes (track and field) at the 1976 Summer Olympics
Athletes (track and field) at the 1980 Summer Olympics
Sportspeople from Woking
English male pole vaulters
Commonwealth Games medallists in athletics
Athletes (track and field) at the 1970 British Commonwealth Games
Athletes (track and field) at the 1974 British Commonwealth Games
Commonwealth Games bronze medallists for England
Athletes (track and field) at the 1978 Commonwealth Games
Athletes (track and field) at the 1986 Commonwealth Games
Medallists at the 1974 British Commonwealth Games
Medallists at the 1978 Commonwealth Games